Riotorto is a town located in the Spanish province of Lugo.

Civil parishes
Aldurfe (San Pedro)
Espasande de Baixo (Santa María)
Ferreiravella (San Xillao)
Galegos (Santa María)
A Muxueira (San Lourenzo)
A Órrea (Santa Comba)
Riotorto (San Pedro)
Santa Marta de Meilán (Santa Marta)

External links 
Concello de Riotorto
Riotorto at Wikimedia Commons
Riotorto page at Diputación Provincial de Lugo
Federación Galega de Municipios e Provincias

Municipalities in the Province of Lugo